Italo Acconcia (20 April 1925 – 12 February 1983) was an Italian football player and manager who played as a midfielder. He spent most of his career in the Italian Serie A. In 1981, he managed the national under-21 team during the 1981 FIFA World Youth Championship.

Honours
Roma
Serie B Championship: 1951–52

Genoa
Serie B Championship: 1952–53

References

1925 births
1983 deaths
People from L'Aquila
Italian footballers
Italian football managers
Association football midfielders
Serie A players
Serie B players
L'Aquila Calcio 1927 players
U.S. Catanzaro 1929 players
ACF Fiorentina players
Udinese Calcio players
A.S. Roma players
Genoa C.F.C. players
Modena F.C. players
U.S. Salernitana 1919 players
Empoli F.C. players
Sportspeople from the Province of L'Aquila
Footballers from Abruzzo